Krzysztof Rojek (born 16 February 1972) is a Polish boxer. He competed in the men's heavyweight event at the 1992 Summer Olympics.

References

1972 births
Living people
Polish male boxers
Olympic boxers of Poland
Boxers at the 1992 Summer Olympics
People from Żagań
Sportspeople from Lubusz Voivodeship
Heavyweight boxers